Blue Valley Songbird is a 1999 American made-for-television musical drama film directed by Richard A. Colla and starring Dolly Parton. It was filmed in Nashville, Tennessee and originally premiered on Lifetime on November 1, 1999.

Plot
Dolly Parton stars as country singer Leana Taylor who struggles to escape from her controlling manager/boyfriend, Hank (John Terry), as well as her troubled past.  After turning to her guitarist (Billy Dean), Leana finally faces her past, including her estranged mother and the death of her father.

Through flashbacks, Leana's father is shown to be an abusive and controlling man who would not allow Leana to sing for anyone but himself, and once, viciously attacked a boy Leana was playing with while, in the present, during this particular flashback, Hank attacks one of Leana's musicians in a jealous rage. Leana finds herself reliving painful memories of her controlling father, awakened by Hank's domineering behaviour. In another flashback, Leana's father threatens her after she hits him with a tire iron while he is physically abusing Leana's mother. Leana's mother eventually sent her off to Nashville where, free of her father, she joined a church choir.

In the end, Leana is able to escape from Hank and reconcile with her mother before entering the studio to cut her first record. The film ends with Leana singing Blue Valley Songbird in concert with Hank watching from the back of the room before leaving.

Songs
There was no official soundtrack released, but some songs are available on other Dolly releases as noted below.

"Blue Valley Songbird" - Written and Performed by Dolly Parton
(available on the Hungry Again album)

"I Hope You're Never Happy" - Written by Dolly Parton
Performed by Dolly Parton featuring Billy Dean
(available on the Real Love album)

"Wildflowers" - Written and Performed by Dolly Parton
(available on the Trio album with Linda Ronstadt & Emmylou Harris)

"We Might Be In Love" - Written by Dolly Parton
Performed by Dolly Parton and Billy Dean

"My Blue Tears" - Written and Performed by Dolly Parton
(available on the Coat of Many Colors, Heartsongs and Little Sparrow albums)

"Runaway Feeling" - Written by Dolly Parton
Performed by Dolly Parton featuring Billy Dean
(available on the Eagle When She Flies album - Dolly only)

"Amazing Grace" - Written by John Newton
Performed by Dolly Parton
(available on the Precious Memories album)

"Angel Band" - (Traditional)
Performed by Dolly Parton

 Announced Remake 
In July 2021, Deadline reported that this film, alongside The Babysitter's Seduction, Sex, Lies & Obsession, Sex & Mrs. X, Santa Who?, A Different Kind of Christmas'' and over a 100 other films in the Hearst Entertainment library was up for consideration to be remade by the library's IP holder, Lionsgate, alongside independent production and distribution company MarVista Entertainment. Both companies, who will jointly distribute these films, didn't elaborate on certain details, but claimed that the films will be made to target "digitally native audiences" and have set their sights on releasing them to a streaming service.

References

External links

1999 television films
1999 films
1990s musical drama films
American musical drama films
Films about domestic violence
Domestic violence in television
1990s English-language films
Lifetime (TV network) films
Films directed by Richard A. Colla
American drama television films
1990s American films